The Waldo Street Police Station is a historic former police station on Waldo Street in Worcester, Massachusetts.  Built in 1918 to a design by  George H. Clemence, it is a distinctive local example of Renaissance Revival architecture.  It served as the city's police headquarters and district until 1980, and now houses commercial tenants.  The building, now part of One Exchange Place, was listed on the National Register of Historic Places in 1980.

Description and history
The former Waldo Street Police Station is located in downtown Worcester, at the corner of Waldo Street and Exchange Street.  It is a three story masonry structure, built out of red brick and terracotta trim and set on a high foundation.  Its two main entrances face Waldo Street, set recessed in rounded arches surrounded by elaborate terracotta carvings; the north entrance is marked "Police" while the south one is marked "Courts".  A cornice separates the second and third floors, and the third floor windows are set in groups in round-arch recesses.  Each window in the group has a rounded top, and the group is topped by a round decorative panel.  The building has a heavily bracketed cornice.

The station was built in 1918 to a design by local architect George H. Clemence, to replace the city's 1880s-era police headquarters.  The building was closed as a police station in 1980.  Now known as One Exchange Place, it has a variety of commercial and professional tenants.

See also
National Register of Historic Places listings in northwestern Worcester, Massachusetts
National Register of Historic Places listings in Worcester County, Massachusetts

References

Government buildings on the National Register of Historic Places in Massachusetts
Renaissance Revival architecture in Massachusetts
Infrastructure completed in 1918
Buildings and structures in Worcester, Massachusetts
Police stations on the National Register of Historic Places
National Register of Historic Places in Worcester, Massachusetts